Foster Appiah (born 16 August 2000) is a Ghanaian professional footballer who plays as midfielder for Ghanaian Premier League side Bechem United F.C.

Career 
Appiah started his career with Bechem United and he was part of the senior team during the 2019–20 season. On 29 December 2019, he was named on the bench for the first time in a match in a 2–0 victory over Elmina Sharks. He didn't make a league appearance that season as the league was brought to a halt due to the COVID-19 pandemic in Ghana. He however made the squad list for the 2020–21 season when the league resumed and made his professional debut in a 2–0 loss to rivals Berekum Chelsea on 3 February 2021. He played started the match and played 75 minutes before being substituted for Listowel Amankona. On 13 June 2021, during the second of the season, he played the full 90 minutes as Bechem revenged and scored Berekum Chelsea by the same 2–0 scoreline.

References

External links 
 

Living people
2000 births
Association football midfielders
Ghanaian footballers
Bechem United F.C. players
Ghana Premier League players